Presika is a village in Croatia. It is connected by the D3 highway.

References

Populated places in Primorje-Gorski Kotar County